West Hampstead Thameslink is a National Rail station on the Midland Main Line and is served by Thameslink trains as part of the Thameslink route between Kentish Town and Cricklewood. The station is in Travelcard Zone 2.

History

The station was built by the Midland Railway on its extension to St. Pancras, to serve the newly developed area around the hamlet of West End. It opened on 1 March 1871, and was originally named West End for Kilburn and Hampstead.

For a short period from 1878 the station formed part of the Super Outer Circle, Midland trains running through from St Pancras to Earl's Court via Acton Central and Turnham Green.

It was renamed several times: to West End on 1 July 1903; to West End and Brondesbury on 1 April 1904; to West Hampstead on 1 September 1905; West Hampstead Midland on 25 September 1950; and finally West Hampstead Thameslink on 16 May 1988. It was popular for many years for people taking a day out on Hampstead Heath and those visiting the chalybeate springs in Hampstead itself.

Oyster Pay as you go was introduced in late 2007.

From March 2009, Southeastern and Thameslink began running some peak hour trains from Sevenoaks to Luton, though in the off-peak these services turn back at Kentish Town.

Proposed developments

Additional Thameslink services
Additional trains from destinations across the larger Thameslink network may call at the station from 2018.

Connections
London Buses routes 139, 328 and C11 serve the station.

Services
As its name suggests, West Hampstead Thameslink is on the Thameslink Route and all train services are operated by Thameslink.

This station has 4 platforms, numbered from the east to the west:
 Platform 1 is on the southbound slow line.
 Platform 2 is on the northbound slow line.
 Platform 3 is on the southbound fast line.
 Platform 4 is on the northbound fast line.

East Midlands Railway trains and some Thameslink fast trains pass through platforms 3 and 4 non-stop, while  to  Thameslink fast trains call at platforms 3 and 4. All stations and semi-fast Thameslink trains use platforms 1 and 2.

The current off-peak service in trains per hour is:
 2 tph to  via  from platform 3

During the peak hours, there are additional services to  via .

See also
Stations in West Hampstead

References

Railway stations in the London Borough of Camden
DfT Category E stations
Former Midland Railway stations
Railway stations in Great Britain opened in 1871
Railway stations served by Govia Thameslink Railway